Kamminga is a surname. Notable people with the surname include:

Arno Kamminga (born 1995), Dutch swimmer
Johan Kamminga, Australian archaeologist
Jorrit Kamminga (born 1976), Director at International Council on Security and Development
Menno T. Kamminga (born 1949), Dutch international law scholar